Kahshur-e Ali Nazer (also Romanized as Kahshūr-e ʿAlī Naẓer) is a village in Howmeh-ye Sharqi Rural District, in the Central District of Izeh County, Khuzestan Province, Iran. At the 2006 census, its population was 127, in 26 families.

References 

Populated places in Izeh County